These Blues of Mine is the second album by jazz organist Trudy Pitts, recorded in 1967 and released on the Prestige label.

Reception

Allmusic awarded the album 3 stars stating "Better than expected soul-jazz interpretations of contemporary rock and pop songs stand alongside jazz originals... It works best when they cut to straight, burning soul-jazz groovers".

Track listing 
All compositions by Bill Carney except as noted
 "Organology" - 4:00  
 "The House of the Rising Sun" (Traditional) - 3:39  
 "Just Us Two" - 5:05  
 "Eleanor Rigby" (John Lennon, Paul McCartney) - 2:51  
 "Count Nine" (Trudy Pitts) - 4:15  
 "Man and a Woman" (Chuck Calhoun) - 4:20  
 "A Whiter Shade of Pale" (Gary Brooker, Keith Reid, Matthew Fisher) - 3:10  
 "Teddy Makes Three" - 3:03  
 "These Blues of Mine" (Bill Carney, Sonny Truitt) - 5:25  
 "What the World Needs Now" (Burt Bacharach, Hal David) - 3:23

Personnel 
Trudy Pitts - organ, vocals
Pat Martino - guitar
Bill Carney - drums

References 

Trudy Pitts albums
1967 albums
Prestige Records albums
Albums recorded at Van Gelder Studio
Albums produced by Cal Lampley